The order of precedence, in ascending order is as follows:

 Regional court
 Higher court
 Supreme court

Public law 

 Administrative court
 State court

Appointment of judges 
The Prince has the overall power to appoint the nation's judges.

Supreme Court 
The Supreme Court of Liechtenstein is the highest judicial body in Liechtenstein. Under the Constitution of Liechtenstein., all courts were brought under Liechtenstein control. Previously, the court of Appeal was based in Vienna, Austria. 

The Supreme court is one of three courts and is the third and final Court. It exercises power over both civil and criminal matters. In 2020 it handled over 128 cases 

The court is made up of 3 Judges and a President who both regulate each other.

Constitutional Court 
The Constitutional court was established in 1921, the first of its kind in Europe. The court consists of a president and 4 judges.

Under article 96 of the Liechtenstein Constitution, the Prince appoints half of the Judges and Parliament the other half. 

The court rules on Constitutional rights, European Court of Human Rights issues and EEA rights. Both corporations and humans are able to appeal to the court. The court is also able to assess parliamentary legislation and nullify unconstitutional laws. Citizens are able to petition the court to review the law, as long as 100 citizens support the motion. The Constitu­tional Court also decides upon conflicts of jurisdic­tion between admini­strative and judicial authorities, as well as upon impeachment proceedings aga­inst mini­sters and electoral disputes.

State Court 
The State Court rules on the conformity of laws with the constitution and has five members elected by parliament.

References 

Law of Liechtenstein
Supreme courts